The Shoes are a French electro-rock duo originally from Reims created in 2007. It consists of Guillaume Brière and Benjamin Lebeau, who are both songwriters and producers.
Before creating the concurrent group in 2007, Benjamin and Guillaume were the two members of The Film, a rock band that formed in Bordeaux in 2005. Guillaume Brière also formed the duo G. Vump along with Brodinski from Reims. Brière is also known under the alias Vladimir Cauchemar since 2017.

History 
On March 7, 2011, the band released their first album Crack My Bones, on the independent French label Green United Music. The album includes ten original tracks, including nine in collaboration with French and international artists such as Esser, Wave Machines, Primary 1, Anthonin Ternant (from The Bewitched Hands) and Cock'n'Bull Kid.

At the same year, several of the songs on the album also resulted in the making of video clips: Cover Your Eyes (directed by We are from LA), Wastin' Time (directed by Yoann Lemoine) and Stay the Same (directed by Daniel Wolfe).
The Shoes performed at La Cigale during a sold-out concert on 9 November 2011. They were then among the ten finalists of the Constantin Prize in 2011 and won the 'Innovation Award' at the UK Music Video Awards 2011 with the clip Cover Your Eyes.
The album Crack My Bones was placed in ninth place of the ranking of the "100 best albums of the year 2011" by the magazine Les Inrockuptibles.

They performed to Emilia Clarke on Le Grand Journal featuring their friend Peter "Dennis" Brown of the project Postaal. Postaal went on to have limited success of its own.

Discography

Albums 
Scandal (2009, Green United Music)
 New York (feat. Boy Crisis)		
 Baby Baby		
 Crack My Bones		
 Let's Go		
 '7 AM		
  Bored	
 Whips Like a Clap		
 Investigator		
 What Kind of Girl?		
 America		
 Knock Out		
 America (Brodinski Remix)		
 Amknock Out (80Kidz Remix)		
 America (Yes Giantess' Mac Doe Remix)

Crack My Bones (2011, Green United Music)

 Stay the Same (featuring Esser)
 Cover Your Eyes (featuring Wave Machines)
 People Movin' (featuring Primary 1)
 Wastin' Time (featuring Esser)
 Time to Dance (featuring Anthonin Ternant)
 Cliché (featuring Cock'n'Bullkid)
 Crack My Bones (featuring Anthonin Ternant)
 Bored (featuring Anthonin Ternant)
 The Wolf Under the Moon (featuring Anthonin Ternant)
 Investigator

Chemicals (2015, Green United Music)
 Submarine (featuring Blaine Harrison)
 Made For You (featuring Esser)
 Drifted (featuring SAGE)
 Lost In London (featuring Petite Noir)
 Vortex Of Love (featuring  Blaine Harrison)
 Us & I (featuring Esser)
 Give It Away (featuring Postaal)
 15 Instead & Brown (featuring Mikill Pane)
 Feed The Ghost (featuring Blue Daisy, Amateur Best & Black Atlass)
 Whistle

EP and singles 
Knock Out (2008, 50 Bones)
 Knock Out
 Red Light

Stade de Reims (2008, Green United Music)
 America
 America (Brodinski Remix)
 Keep That Control (Rockin'Shoes Mix)
 Keep That Control (Yuksek Lost Control Remix)

Oh Lord (2009, 50 Bones)
 Oh Lord
 People Movin'

People Movin' (2009, Green United Music)
 People Movin' (featuring Primary 1)
 Bored (featuring Anthonin Ternant)
 People Movin' (Siriusmo Remix)

Stay the Same (2010, Green United Music)
 Stay the Same (Original Version)
 Stay the Same (featuring Der Kreisel)
 Stay the Same (Isolee Remix)
 Stay the Same (Adam Kesher Remix)
 Stay the Same (Siriusmo & Jan Driver Remix)
 Stay the Same (Harvard Bass Remix)
 Stay the Same (Étienne de Crécy Remix)
 Stay the Same (Donovans Remix)

Time to Dance (2012, Green United Music)
 Time to Dance (Extended Version)
 Time to Dance (Original Version)
 Time to Dance (SebastiAn Remix)
 Time to Dance (DDDXIE Remix)
 Time to Tanz (Esser Remix)
 Time to Dance (Rocky Piano Mix)

Give It Away (2015)

1960's Horror ft. Dominic Lord (2016)

Productions and synchros 
 Shakira – Loca (arrangements and additional production)
 Gaëtan Roussel – Ginger (arrangements, production and additional production)
 Mammuth – OST (composed with Gaëtan Roussel)
 Julien Doré – Kiss Me Forever (composition & writing)
 Raphael – Pacific 31 (arrangements, production and artistic production)
 Cœur de Pirate – Golden Baby (arrangements, production and artistic production)
 Lilly Wood and the Prick – My Best (additional production)
 Yuksek – Living on the Edge of Time (arrangements and composition)
 Philippe Katerine – Té-lé-phone (radio edit)
 Woodkid – Iron (production)

Synchros
 People Movin for Jean-Charles de Castelbajac défilé (spring–summer 2011)
 Bored in the 3rd season of Gossip Girl
 Time to Dance' in Les Infidèles'' (movie, 2012)

 Awards and nominations Antville Music Video Awards|-
| rowspan=2|2011
| rowspan=2|"Stay the Same"
| Best Cinematography
| 
|-
| rowspan=2|Best Narrative
| 
|-
| rowspan=3|2012
| rowspan=3|"Time to Dance"
| 
|-
| Best Editing 
| 
|-
| Video of the Year 
| Camerimage!Ref.
|-
|2012
|"Time to Dance"
| Best Music Video
| 
|UK Music Video Awards'

|-
| rowspan=2|2011
| "Cover Your Eyes"
| The Innovation Award
| 
|-
| "Stay the Same"
| Best Rock/Indie Video 
| 
|-
| rowspan=5|2012
| rowspan=5|"Time to Dance"
| Best Editing
| 
|-
| Best Art Direction
| 
|-
| Best Telecine 
| 
|-
| Best Editing 
| 
|-
| Best Dance Video
| 
|-
| 2015
| "Feed the Ghost"
| Best Lyric Video
| 
|-
| rowspan=4|2016
| "Submarine" (feat. Blaine Harrison) 
| rowspan=3|Best Alternative Video
| 
|-
| "Drifted"
| 
|-
| rowspan=2|"1960's Horror" (feat. Dominic Lord)
| 
|-
| Best Editing 
|

References

External links 
 
The Shoes on Label Gum (Green United Music)
The Shoes on Discogs

French electronic rock musical groups